Henri Pierre Bernard (24 July 1900 – 11 May 1967) was a French hurdler. He competed in the 110 m event at the 1920 and 1924 Summer Olympics, but failed to reach the finals.

References

External links
 

1900 births
1967 deaths
French male hurdlers
Olympic athletes of France
Athletes (track and field) at the 1920 Summer Olympics
Athletes (track and field) at the 1924 Summer Olympics
Sportspeople from Boulogne-Billancourt
20th-century French people